Misapata (Quechua misa table, pata elevated place; above, at the top;  edge, bank, shore, also spelled  Mesapata) is a mountain in the Andes of Peru, about  high. It is situated in the Ayacucho Region, Lucanas Province, Cabana District. It lies northwest of Anqasi and east of Saywa (Saygua).

References 

Mountains of Peru
Mountains of Ayacucho Region